Australian Fighting Championship (AFC) is an Australian mixed martial arts (MMA) organisation based in Melbourne. In 2013 AFC was described as Australia's leading MMA organisation by MMA Kanvas and is part of Sherdog's list of top 50 global MMA organisations (2014). Since AFC 4, all events have been successfully streamed live via pay-per-view.

AFC was the second ranked Australasian promotion in 2013 according to MMA media outlet Fight Sport Asia. AFC CEO Adam Milankovic has had multiple media appearances promotioning the sport of MMA to the public. AFC has showcased the talents of elite Australian and New Zealand mixed martial artists alongside international talent. 2017 has seen the expansion of the promotion into Mainland China and a major rebranding to the Australasian Fighting Championship (AFC).

Cage ban

The 2008 "cage ban" in Victoria meant MMA competitions, while legal were conducted inside a boxing ring and not a purpose built cage (with the exception of AFC 9 in Albury, New South Wales). In the Victorian State election in November 2014, The Victorian branch of the Labor Party campaigned to revoke the cage ban. With success in the election the ban is set to be repealed allowing AFC to promote MMA in a caged enclosure to ensure optimum safety of fighters.

Current champions

Australian Fighting Championship Title history

Australian Fighting Championship Heavyweight Championship
Weight limit:

Australian Fighting Championship Light Heavyweight Championship
Weight limit:

Australian Fighting Championship Middleweight Championship
Weight limit:

Australian Fighting Championship Welterweight Championship
Weight limit:

Australian Fighting Championship Lightweight Championship
Weight limit:

Australian Fighting Championship Featherweight Championship
Weight limit:

Australian Fighting Championship Bantamweight Championship
Weight limit:

Scheduled events

Past events

Notable alumni
Israel Adesanya (UFC)
Hector Lombard (UFC)
Soa Palelei (UFC)
Dylan Andrews (UFC)
Richie Vaculik (UFC)
Peter Graham (Bellator)
Bec Rawlings (UFC)
Dan Kelly (UFC)
Jake Matthews (UFC)
Dan Hooker (UFC)
Damien Brown (UFC)
Alexander Volkanovski (UFC)
Tai Tuivasa (UFC)
Luke Jumeau (UFC)
Tyson Pedro (UFC)

References

External links

List of Events on Sherdog

2010 establishments in Australia
Mixed martial arts in Australia
Mixed martial arts organizations
Sports organizations established in 2010